CFCM may refer to:

 CFCM-TV, a television station (channel 4) licensed to Quebec City, Quebec, Canada
 French Council of the Muslim Faith
 Canadian Fellowship of Churches and Ministries
 Certified Federal Contracts Manager (See National Contract Management Association)